Ernst Schneider may refer to:

 Ernst Schneider (communist) (1883–1970s), German sailor who played an active part in the German Revolution of November 1918 and who participated in the Hamburg Uprising of October 1923
 Ernst Schneider, Austrian engineer and inventor of the Voith Schneider Propeller
 Ernst-Schneider-Preis, a German journalism prize
 Hans Ernst Schneider (athlete), see Athletics at the 1952 Summer Olympics – Men's 400 metres